Jiří Rosický (born 2 September 1948) is a Czech retired footballer who played as a defender.

Football career
Rosický made 90 appearances in the Czechoslovak First League between 1966 and 1981, scoring one goal. As well as playing for Sparta Prague and Bohemians ČKD Prague, his clubs included Dukla Prague and Tatra Smíchov.

Personal life
Rosický is the father of two other footballers, namely Jiří and Tomáš.

References

1948 births
Living people
Czech footballers
Association football defenders
AC Sparta Prague players
Dukla Prague footballers
Bohemians 1905 players